Inverchaolain is a hamlet on the Cowal peninsula, Argyll and Bute, Scotland. It lies on the east shore of Loch Striven, to the south of Glenstriven and to the north of Knockdow.

There is a church (Inverchaolain Church), manse and graveyard. The church was built in 1912.

References

External links

 Gaelic place names of Scotland - website

Highlands and Islands of Scotland
Villages in Cowal